Pingtan Island or Haitan Island is an island of Fuzhou off the east coast of mainland Asia in Pingtan County, Fujian Province, China (PRC), south of the complex estuary of the Min River. It is the largest island in Fujian and the fifth-largest island administered by the People's Republic of China.

History
In June 1955, there were considerable road and military constructions across the Haitan Island, including roads leading to possible artillery positions on the mainland. These positions might have been used to protect the Haitan Strait, which was thought of as a favorable staging area for further amphibious operations against the Matsu Islands, and even Taiwan.

The site was added to the UNESCO World Heritage Tentative List in 2001, under Haitan Scenic Spots, in the Mixed category (Cultural & Natural).

Geography
Administratively, the island is part of Pingtan County, which also includes several smaller islands and part of the nearby mainland. Most of the county's towns, including its seat of government at Tancheng, are on the island. Large areas of the island's coast have undergone land reclamation, along with major building and infrastructure projects.
Pingtan is separated from mainland China by the Haitan Strait. Most of the nearby mainland is the county-level city of Fuqing, administered as part of the prefecture-level city of Fuzhou.

Pingtan is separated from Taiwan Island by the Taiwan Strait. Following the completion of its bridge to the mainland in 2010, Pingtan may be considered as the closest part of the Chinese "mainland" to the Taiwan Island.

Under current international agreement, the island's southernmost extremity forms the boundary between the East and South China Seas. In the still-unapproved draft of the new edition of the IHO's Limits of Oceans and Seas, the northernmost extremity of the islandforms the boundary between the East China Sea and the Taiwan Strait, with the South China Sea having its northern boundary moved to the south end of the strait.

Climate 
Under the Köppen climate classification, Pingtan has a humid subtropical climate (Cfa) climate, characterized by hot, humid summers and mild winters. Over the course of the year, the average temperature is about 66.92 °F. The hottest day of the year is between July and August, with an average 82.4 °F. The coldest day of the year is between January and February, with an average 51.8 °F. Pingtan has never experienced an extreme temperature under 32 °F. Because Pingtan is located between Haitan Strait and Taiwan Strait, the windspeed is high with annual average 4.8 m/s.

Environment 

"Blue tears" are caused by a plankton bloom named Vargula hilgendorfii. This animal radiates light when disturbed in turbulent water, thus creating a blue glow. This usually occurs in summer, during April to August. "Blue tears" attracts many tourists to Pingtan. However, a large break out of "Blue tears" may harm the environment, as it depletes oxygen and releases toxin in sea. This may cause a red tide.

Economy
The island relies on tourism and anticipates that foreign investment will spur economic growth. The first major bridge to cross the Haitan Strait was completed in November 2010, connecting the island to Fuqing on the mainland. Spanning 4,976 meters, it cost 1.4 billion RMB (about US$200 million) to build.

An 88.5-km-long Fuzhou-Pingtan Railway (the Fuping Railway, 福平铁路), connecting 
Fuzhou to Pingtan Island, via Changle and a series of bridges, is under construction. The project was approved in November 2012. It was expected that the work would start by the end of the year, and was completed on December 26, 2020.

In early 2012, it was announced that a large cloud computing center would be built in Pingtan.

Culture
A  museum, the Pingtan Art Museum, is currently under construction in the island. The museum, designed by the Chinese-American firm MAD Studio on an artificial island, is scheduled for completion in 2016.

Places of interest 

Because of Pingtan's location, it experiences strong sea winds throughout the entire year. To combat the weather, villagers build their houses with rocks. The old traditional stone-built houses are resistant to wind and roaring waves. Moreover, the house are comfortable to live in. This special architectural style attracts many tourists and boosts economic growth. Beigang village is a famous fishing villages, featuring a large number of stone houses. Pingtan has a large ancient cultural building named Haitan Ancient City, a popular vacation site.

The flat beach in Pingtan is also an attractive destination, featuring a long coastline and pristine beach. Longfengtou Beach is a famous beach, covering about 21 hectares, at 9.5 kilometers long. It is located next to Haitan Bay.

Sports 
At the 2017 China Sports Culture: Sports Tourism Expo, Pingtan was nominated as "2017 China's Top Ten Sports Tourism Destinations". In recent years, Pingtan has made use of its policy advantages, location advantages and natural resources advantages to successfully host several International Kite Surfing Festivals, International Cycling Opens, Open Water Swimming Championships, International Sailing Tournaments, National Beach Volleyball Tournaments, and World Fight Tournaments. Pingtan Sports Tourism Project has attracted widespread attention from the industry and tourists.

Kiteboarding 
Because of the location, Pingtan is the region with the best wind conditions in China. The average annual wind reaches 20 knots. The best time for kiteboarding in Pingtan is from May to November. With the ideal wind condition and flat water, the LV beach becomes the most popular practice place in Pingtan. For people who come from afar, learning kitesurfing in Pingtan saves not only a lot of time and economic costs, but also could find the fun of kitesurfing in a short term. In Pingtan, most clubs adopt the IKO International Kite Surfing Association's teaching specifications. All training courses uses Ozone, Airush, and NORTH top kite surfing equipment. There are also many kiteboarding competition in Pingtan. In 2019 International Kiteboard Championship (Pingtan Station), there are nearly 150 contestants from 20 countries and regions. This is the largest kite surfing event held in Pingtan so far with the largest number of participants. 2019 International Kiteboard Championship (Pingtan Station) is authorized by the International Sailing Federation (WS) and the International Kite Surfing Association (IKA). The international competition level is divided into 200 points, and the total prize money of the competition reaches 50,000 US dollars.

Cycling 
The great weather and beautiful view make Pingtan a good place for cycling. Therefore, there are many cycling competition hold in Pingtan. The "Ocean Cup" China Pingtan International Cycling Open is one of the competitions. The "Ocean Cup" China Pingtan International Cycling Open was founded in 2014. It is the first event in China that combines marine culture with cycling. It is one of the series of events of "6.8 World Ocean Day and National Ocean Promotion Day". The number of participants set a record for domestic cycling single-day events for three consecutive years.

Transportation 
The transportation in Pingtan is rapidly developing. Since it is the closest place between Mainland China and Taiwan, the government attaches great importance to its transportation.

High-speed rail 
On September 28, 2017, the groundbreaking ceremony of the Pingtan High-speed Railway Station was held in Zhonglou Township. On December 26, 2020, as the G5322 train slowly departed from Pingtan railway station, the Fuping Railway, the nearest railway from the mainland to Taiwan Island, was officially opened for operation. The Pingtan Strait Road-Rail Bridge, China’s first road-rail bridge, was put into use simultaneously, and it can be reached within 35 minutes from Fuzhou to Pingtan.

Roads    

On 9 January 2021, as K · Y0303 bus punctuality leaved the Fujian Pingtan old passenger transport, the Fujian Pingtan old passenger transport is closed. The new Pingtan New Automobile Passenger Terminal's main frame was completed on 2 May 2018. It locates at No. 8 Zhongshan Avenue in Pingtan, on the northwest side of the intersection of Jinjingwan Avenue and Tanxi Avenue. The new bus station has a total of 14 operating routes. The face recognition function of the ticket checking machine in the new bus station is also a highlight of the new bus station. There is no need to pick up a ticket when entering the station, as long as people swipe their ID card and perform face recognition.

Bicycles 
On 2017 May 22, 2,000 public vehicles are officially put into use in Pingtan. Citizens only need to apply for a Straits Connect Card to rent bicycles. In the first phase of the Pingtan Public Bicycle Project, there are 52 bicycle stations, and each station has between 20 and 40 bicycles. Charges: free within 1 hour, 1 yuan/hour for 1–2 hours, 2 yuan/hour for 2–3 hours, 3 yuan/hour for more than 3 hours, and no more than 30 yuan per day. The rented public bicycles should be returned within 24 hours. By swiping the card, the fee will be deducted from the IC card settlement.

Maps

See also

 List of islands of Fujian
 Niushan Island
 Fuzhou–Pingtan railway

References

Citations

Bibliography

 .
 .

External links 
UNESCO World Heritage Centre: tentative Haitan Scenic Spots World Heritage Site

Islands of Fujian
Islands of the East China Sea
Islands of the South China Sea
Taiwan Strait
Populated places in Fujian